Clube Desportivo de Tondela is a Portuguese professional football club that plays in Primeira Liga, the top flight of Portuguese football. They are based in the town of Tondela, located in Viseu District, and play in the Estádio João Cardoso. Founded in 1933, the club predominantly played within Portugal's regional leagues until their climb up the league pyramid after 2004.

History

Foundation and early years (1933–1986)
On 6 June 1933, Clube Desportivo de Tondela was founded through a merger of two clubs in the village of Tondela: the Tondela Football Club, founded in 1925, and the Operário Atlético Clube, founded in 1932.

Third Division (1986–1988)
On the 1985–86 season, Tondela won the Divisão Honra title for the third time and achieved the promotion to the Terceira Divisão for the first time. They came in 10th in their first season on a competition ruled by the Portuguese Football Federation. They were relegated in the next season as they finished in 15th.

Lower divisions (1999–2005)
After the relegation from Terceira Divisão in 1999, Tondela went on to compete in the Viseu Regional Division.

In the 2003–04 season, Tondela won the Taça AF Viseu, also known as Taça Sócios de Mérito, the club's first piece of silverware since 1986. In the next season, Tondela became champion of the AF Viseu Liga de Honra. They ended the season eight points ahead of runners-up Tarouquense, and ensured the return to Terceira Divisão.

Days later, Tondela retained the Taça AF Viseu title thus sealing the season with the double.

Returning to Third Division (2005–2009)
During the 2005–08 seasons, Tondela consolidated its position as an upper mid table club, ending those three seasons always in the seventh place.

In the 2008–09 season, Tondela signed central defender Diego, midfielder Gomes and Argentine striker Piojo. On 6 June 2009, Tondela became Third Division champion, after a 4–2 win against Fiães, thus being promoted to Segunda Divisão.

Second Division Era (2009–2012)
After the promotion from the Third Division, and a fourth place in the 2009–10 season, Tondela aimed the promotion to Segunda Liga. During the 2010 summer transfer window, Tondela signed Portuguese under-17 European champion, playmaker Márcio Sousa, veteran goalkeeper Rui Marcos and midfielder Fernando Ferreira. The club finished third in the 2010–11 season with 55 points. Despite not reaching their objectives, Tondela supporters wanted the continuity of manager Filipe Moreira, but he eventually left to Oriental.

The following season, former Benfica and Portugal player, Vítor Paneira was appointed as the new manager. Paneira further increased the efforts to build a solid Tondela team, with such signings as midfielders Magano and Tiago Barros, and Brazilian striker Rafael Batatinha.

Tondela topped the table after a 4–2 win against Espinho on 7 April 2012 and never relinquished their lead. They were crowned champions of Segunda Divisão – Série Centro in Estádio do Bessa after a 1–0 win against Boavista. Their renewed defence, consisting of central defenders Daniel Materazzi, Pica, and the versatile Carlos André, fullbacks Hélder Lopes and Pedrosa, defensive midfielder Fábio Pacheco and former Portuguese under-20 international goalkeeper Nuno Avelino, conceded just 22 goals all season and kept 13 clean sheets.

Consequently, they took part in the promotion play-off against Varzim and Fatima, Serie Norte and Serie Sul champions respectively. On 3 June 2012, after a 1–1 draw against Fatima in Estádio João Cardoso, Tondela achieved their third promotion in eight years, and their first promotion to Segunda Liga. They were runners-up in the play-off, finishing five points behind Varzim.

Joining the Liga de Honra (2012–2015)
The 2012–13 season, the club's first at the professional level, ended with a mid-table finish. It was also Tondela's first appearance in the Taça da Liga.

On 8 November 2013, Paneira was sacked, being replaced three days later by his former teammate, Álvaro Magalhães. After a 9th place in the championship, Álvaro Magalhães left Tondela by "mutual consent" and Carlos Pinto (who had won the 2013–14 Campeonato Nacional with Freamunde) was appointed as the club's new manager. He took with him five players: goalkeeper Rui Nereu, defender Vítor Alves, midfielder Edu Machado and forwards Luís Machado and Joel Silva.

On 6 October 2014, Pinto left Tondela due to poor results. One day later, Quim Machado was announced as Pinto's successor.

The club spent most of the 2014–15 season near the top of the table, and by early April they were at first place. On 24 May 2015, on the final day of the season, a 1–1 draw away at Freamunde was enough to clinch the Championship title, and a first promotion to the top flight of Portuguese football. The goal was scored by André Carvalhas through a direct free kick in the last minute of the game.

Into the Primeira Liga (2015–2022)
On 30 May 2015, Tondela announced the return of Vítor Paneira as the club's manager on a one-year contract. As part of the pre-season friendlies, Tondela played its first two matches abroad: the first one was a 1–1 draw against Hamm Benfica, in Luxembourg; the second was a 3–2 win against Millwall, at their ground, The Den.

Since Tondela's home was undergoing reconstruction, the club debuted in the top flight of Portuguese football playing at the Estádio Municipal de Aveiro on 14 August 2015. The match ended in a controversial 1–2 defeat against Sporting CP. The club's first win in the competition came on the third-round, a 1–0 home win against Nacional da Madeira.

On 6 October 2015 manager Vítor Paneira left the club by mutual consent, with Rui Bento being appointed his successor on the same day. Bento was sacked two months later, following a succession of poor results, leaving the club on the last place with only 5 points. Petit was appointed the new manager on the next day.

At the end of the first half of the season, Tondela had only 8 points from 17 games. By 14 March 2016 they were 11 points adrift from safety.
Between the 27th and the 33rd matchdays, the club made 14 points. In the last round, Tondela won against the relegated Académica de Coimbra by 2–0 and Rio Ave won 2–1 against União da Madeira, meaning that the Auriverdes finished the season in 16th place with 30 points, ahead of União da Madeira. Petit successfully led Tondela to safety from relegation with the feat being dubbed a miracle. Highlights included a 2–2 away draw against Sporting, an historic first time win at Estádio do Dragão by 1–0, and a 4–1 win at Paços de Ferreira.

On the first match of the 2016–17 season, Tondela lost 0–2 against Benfica in the first match that one of the Big Three played in Tondela's ground. On 9 January 2016, Petit left the club and was replaced by Pepa.

Crest and colours
Clube Desportivo de Tondela adopt the colors green and yellow of the city. Its home strip has been a yellow shirt, with multiple green stripes, black shorts and yellow socks.

Stadium
The Estádio João Cardoso is a football stadium in Tondela, Portugal, the home of Tondela.

In 2004 began the remodeling and improvement of the stadium. The new João Cardoso Stadium Complex includes two playing fields for football, one pitch (field 1) and one training pitch (field 2) and also features a sports pavilion.

In 2008, the stadium underwent new requalification works. The official inauguration date was on 27 May 2008. The stadium hosted a Portugal national football team training match, while in their preparation for the UEFA Euro 2008.

Following Tondela's promotion to the top division in 2015, the club upgraded the facility by building two new stands, bringing the capacity up to 5,000, with an increased North Stand (formerly named Bancada CDT) and a renewed Top Stand. The new Top Stand was built from scratch, upgrading the capacity from 700 standing places to 1,500 seating places, while the new North Stand increased the seating capacity from 100 spectators to 2,000. It also has bars, bathrooms and a commercial space below. The newly expanded stadium was inaugurated on 13 December 2015, in a 0–1 defeat against SC Braga.

The stadium has also hosted some matches of Portugal's U-20, U-18, U-16 and Women squads.

Supporters
Tondela has an organized group of supporters (claque, in Portugal) named Febre Amarela (Yellow Fever) founded in 2009.

Players

Current squad

Player of the Year

Managers

Managerial history

Honours

Taça de Portugal: runners-up 2021–22
Supertaça Cândido de Oliveira: runners-up 2022
Segunda Liga: 2014–15
Terceira Divisão: 2008–09
AF Viseu Liga de Honra: 1940–41, 1941–42, 1949–50, 1985–86, 2004–05
AF Viseu Primeira Divisão: 1951–52, 1963–64, 1972–73
Taça AF Viseu: 2003–04, 2004–05

League and cup history
Key

Pos = Final position
Pld = Matches played
W = Matches won
D = Matches drawn
L = Matches lost
GF = Goals for
GA = Goals against
Pts = Points

R1 = Round 1
R2 = Round 2
R3 = Round 3
R4 = Round 4
R5 = Round 5
R6 = Round 6

Seasons
Correct as of the end of the 2020–21 season.

References

External links
CD Tondela Official Site

 
Football clubs in Portugal
Association football clubs established in 1933
1933 establishments in Portugal
Liga Portugal 2 clubs
Primeira Liga clubs